The Mushkoh Valley is a valley situated in Dras. Also known as valley of wild tulips, which are a major attraction for tourists but it's yet to explore. Located within the Indian-administered union territory of Ladakh. Widely considered to be glaciated and unsuitable for human habitation, it came into prominence during the Kargil War in 1999, when Pakistani forces crossed the Line of Control and took up positions in the region. The Mushkoh Valley is situated at the westernmost extremity of Ladakh, to the west of which lies the northern reaches of the Kashmir Valley, located in the Indian-administered union territory of Jammu and Kashmir.

The valley is nestled within Dras—the second-coldest inhabited place in the world.

It has a population settled in a highland village surrounded by the mountains and meadow on all sides. The village has a breathtaking landscape as Dras River also flows through it. From Mushkoh, one can also trek to Tilail in Gurez (Bandipore) in few days which passes through many meadows. The meadows are dotted with different varieties of flowers. The mountain slopes in the Mushkoh Valley are filled with flowers giving the village a breathtaking beauty. The villagers are mostly involved in farming and sheep rearing.

References

Kargil War
Valleys of Ladakh